Voronovo is a rural locality (a village) in Rezhskoye Rural Settlement, Syamzhensky District, Vologda Oblast, Russia. The population was 11 as of 2002.

Geography 
Voronovo is located 33 km northeast of Syamzha (the district's administrative centre) by road. Slobodka is the nearest rural locality.

References 

Rural localities in Syamzhensky District